Shekaraneh (also Romanized as Shekarāneh; also known as Shekarāb-e Pā’īn, Shakar Āb, Shekar Āb, Shekar Āb-e Bālā, Shekar Āb ‘Olyā, and Shikārāb) is a village in Alqurat Rural District, in the Central District of Birjand County, South Khorasan Province, Iran. At the 2006 census, its population was 172, in 52 families.

References 

Populated places in Birjand County